BSFS may refer to: 

 Bachelor of Science in Foreign Service, an undergraduate degree offered by Georgetown University's Walsh School of Foreign Service
 Baltimore Science Fiction Society, a literary organization in Baltimore, Maryland, United States
 Bristol stool scale, also known as the Bristol Stool Form Scale, which helps communication about stools in health care 
 British-Soviet Friendship Society, a former organization in Britain (1946–1991)